Henna Maria Virkkunen (born 4 June 1972) is a Finnish politician who has been serving as a Member of the European Parliament (MEP) since 2014. She is a member of the National Coalition Party, part of the European People's Party. She was Minister of Public Administration and Local Government in the government of Prime Minister Jyrki Katainen from 22 June 2011 to 24 June 2014.

Political career
In parliament, Virkkunen has been serving on the Committee on Industry, Research and Energy (since 2014) and the Committee on Transport and Tourism (since 2021). In 2022, she joined the Committee of Inquiry to investigate the use of Pegasus and equivalent surveillance spyware.  

Virkkunen was the rapporteur on the non-binding opinion on digital platforms and on driving and rest times. 

In addition to her committee assignments, Virkkunen has been a member of the parliament's delegation for relations with South Africa (2014-2019) and with the Arab Peninsula (since 2019). She is also a member of the European Internet Forum; the European Parliament Intergroup on LGBT Rights; the European Parliament Intergroup on the Welfare and Conservation of Animals; and the European Parliament Intergroup on Seas, Rivers, Islands and Coastal Areas.

In December 2020, Virkkunen received the Energy award at The Parliament Magazine's annual MEP Awards.

References

External links

|-

|-

1972 births
Living people
People from Joutsa
National Coalition Party politicians
Ministers of Education of Finland
Ministers of Transport and Public Works of Finland
Members of the Parliament of Finland (2007–11)
Members of the Parliament of Finland (2011–15)
MEPs for Finland 2014–2019
MEPs for Finland 2019–2024
21st-century women MEPs for Finland
Women government ministers of Finland
Women members of the Parliament of Finland